"I Wanna Fall in Love" is a song written by Buddy Brock and Mark Spiro, and recorded by American country music artist Lila McCann.  It was released in September 1997 as the second single from her debut album Lila.  The song reached number 3 on the Billboard Hot Country Singles & Tracks chart in February 1998 and number 1 on the RPM Country Tracks chart in Canada.

Chart performance

Year-end charts

References

1997 singles
1997 songs
Lila McCann songs
Songs written by Mark Spiro
Asylum Records singles
Songs written by Buddy Brock